Madhya Pradesh State Highway 1 (MP SH 1) is State Highway running from Rau till Mandleshwar. It is popularly known as Mhow-Mandleshwar Road.

It travels through dense forests and has various places of tourism interest along the route.
Jam Gate being one of them. It is a historic Gate built by erstwhile rulers which looks upon the Ghats and Valleys.

See Also
List of state highways in Madhya Pradesh

References

State Highways in Madhya Pradesh